Tan Sri Dato' Lee Kim Sai (1 March 1937 – 24 November 2019) was a Malaysian politician. In the 1980s and 1990s, he served as Labour Minister (1985–1989), Housing and Local Government Minister (1989–1990) and Health Minister (1990–1995); and was deputy president of Malaysian Chinese Association (MCA) (1986–1996), a major component party of the Barisan Nasional (BN) coalition.

Early life
Lee was born on 1 March 1937 to a poor family in Ulu Klang, Selangor, and was brought up in Jinjang, Kuala Lumpur. He was educated at Chong Hwa High School in Kuala Lumpur, then trained as a teacher at the Teachers' Training College in Kuala Lumpur. He started teaching in 1957, and rose to become the principal of Kepong Chinese School.

Political career

Lee joined the MCA in 1965, and stood for Selangor State Legislative Assembly constituency of Kepong in the 1969 general election, but lost to Tan Chee Khoon of Parti Gerakan Rakyat Malaysia (Gerakan). In the 1974 general election he contested and won the Rawang state seat, which he retained in the 1978 election. He became head of MCA Youth in 1979, and was also elected vice-president of MCA the same year. He was elected as the Member of Parliament (MP) in the 1982 general election for Ulu Selangor, and was appointed deputy minister in the Prime Minister's Department.

In 1984, in a row over allegation of fictitious membership that supported the Acting President Dr. Neo Yee Pan, he was expelled from MCA along with Tan Koon Swan, Ling Liong Sik and others by the Acting President. In the ensuing party election to resolve the crisis, Tan Koon Swan was elected president with the largest majority in the party's history, and Lee was elected one of the party vice-presidents as well as the secretary general. Tan however resigned the next year over a scandal involving his business dealings in Singapore, and Ling Liong Sik took over as president while Lee moved up to become the Deputy President. Lee was appointed Minister of Labour in 1985, and in 1989, he became Minister of Housing and Local Government. He then became the Minister of Health from 1990 until 1995. Lee also successfully won the Hulu Langat federal constituency for two terms consecutively in both the 1986 general election and 1990 general election.

In 1993, he attempted to challenge Ling for the leadership of MCA, but backed down after failing to gain enough support. He retired from politics in 1996.

Controversies 
Lee was outspoken on a number of sensitive issues, such as questioning the Malaysian New Economic Policy and the political dominance of the Malays. In particular, in early November 1986, the Selangor MCA of which he was its head, passed a resolution in its annual convention calling on the government to review the Sedition Act and to make it an offence to refer or call any of the country's three major races as immigrants or pendatang. The resolution, which stated that Malaysia's three major races originated from other countries and that none of them should brand the others as immigrants and claim themselves to be natives. This was interpreted as challenging the bumiputra status of the Malays, which led to calls for his sacking by members of United Malays National Organisation (UMNO), and the withdrawal of his datukship by the Sultan of Selangor (later restored). He also joined a protest rally with the opposition then; Democratic Action Party (DAP) objecting to the appointments of senior assistants and supervisors without qualifications in Mandarin in Chinese primary schools.  The events precipitated the Operation Lalang in 1987 whereby over a hundred politicians and activists were detained, and Lee left for Australia for a few months.

Death
After suffering from a stroke since October 2018, Lee died on 24 November 2019 at 12.30 a.m. at family home in Jalan Setia Bakti, Bukit Damansara, Kuala Lumpur. His remains were buried at Xiao En Memorial Park, Nilai, Negeri Sembilan.

Election results

Honours
  : 
 Medal of the Order of the Defender of the Realm (PPN) (1974)
  Commander of the Order of Loyalty to the Crown of Malaysia (PSM) – Tan Sri  (2000)
  :
  (revoked on 23 October 1987)
  Knight Commander of the Order of the Crown of Selangor (DPMS) – Dato' (1979, revoked on 23 October 1987 and reinstated on 8 March 1990)

References

External links
  Lee Kim Sai at Malaysia Factbook

1937 births
2019 deaths
People from Selangor
Malaysian people of Hakka descent
Malaysian politicians of Chinese descent
Malaysian Chinese Association politicians
Members of the Selangor State Legislative Assembly
Members of the Dewan Rakyat
Health ministers of Malaysia
Government ministers of Malaysia
Commanders of the Order of Loyalty to the Crown of Malaysia
21st-century Malaysian politicians
Knights Commander of the Order of the Crown of Selangor
Medallists of the Order of the Defender of the Realm